The Wood is a suburb of the South Island, New Zealand city of Nelson. It lies just to the north-east of the city centre and adjoins it.

The suburb incorporates Botanical Reserve, a section of Nelson's town belt that includes the trigonometrical geographic centre of New Zealand, Botanical Hill. The reserve borders the Botanical Gardens to the east and Branford Park to the west.

The suburb also has four other public reserves: Guppy Park, Neale Park, Peace Grove and Pepper Tree Park.

Demographics

The Wood had a population of 2,907 at the 2018 New Zealand census, an increase of 72 people (2.5%) since the 2013 census, and an increase of 117 people (4.2%) since the 2006 census. There were 1,263 households. There were 1,371 males and 1,536 females, giving a sex ratio of 0.89 males per female. The median age was 50.2 years (compared with 37.4 years nationally), with 360 people (12.4%) aged under 15 years, 450 (15.5%) aged 15 to 29, 1,257 (43.2%) aged 30 to 64, and 837 (28.8%) aged 65 or older.

Ethnicities were 85.8% European/Pākehā, 9.1% Māori, 1.8% Pacific peoples, 8.6% Asian, and 2.7% other ethnicities (totals add to more than 100% since people could identify with multiple ethnicities).

The proportion of people born overseas was 29.1%, compared with 27.1% nationally.

Although some people objected to giving their religion, 51.0% had no religion, 37.0% were Christian, 0.8% were Hindu, 0.5% were Muslim, 1.4% were Buddhist and 2.8% had other religions.

Of those at least 15 years old, 603 (23.7%) people had a bachelor or higher degree, and 483 (19.0%) people had no formal qualifications. The median income was $25,700, compared with $31,800 nationally. The employment status of those at least 15 was that 948 (37.2%) people were employed full-time, 396 (15.5%) were part-time, and 72 (2.8%) were unemployed.

References

Suburbs of Nelson, New Zealand
Populated places around Tasman Bay / Te Tai-o-Aorere